Plan A Plan B is a 2022 Indian Hindi-language romantic comedy film starring Riteish Deshmukh and Tamannaah; directed by Shashanka Ghosh and written by Rajat Arora. It premiered on Netflix on 30 September 2022.

Plot 

Nirali's mother is a matchmaker. On one of her arranged marriages, Nirali's mother announces her retirement and hands over the business to Nirali. She also tells Nirali that she has already booked a shared working space and paid for it for a year. On the day she moves in, she finds out that her office is right next to the office of Kaustubh 'Kosty' Chogule, a divorce lawyer.

Cast  
 Riteish Deshmukh as Advocate Kaustubh Chougule (Kosty)
 Tamannaah as Dr. Nirali Vora
 Kusha Kapila as Seema
 Poonam Dhillon as Kiran Vora
 Pooja Singh as Taruna

Soundtrack

Release and reception 
The film released on 30 September 2022 via Netflix. Saibal Chatterji of NDTV wrote, "Plan A Plan B is a rom-com that skims the surface of matters of the heart as men and women, whether entering into matrimony or opting out of it, negotiate the sharp bends on the way. The film potters around without much of a roadmap. The result is a flimsy affair that leaves far too much to the actors to salvage". Shubhra Gupta of The Indian Express wrote, "I had hopes that there would be some zest to the proceedings [...] But as soon as the attraction-despite-everything arc begins, the film turns decisively tepid and flat". Archika Khurana of The Times of India wrote, "For people to believe that "opposites attract," this 106-minute film is as formulaic as it is ambitious".

References

External links 
 

2020s Hindi-language films
Hindi-language Netflix original films
Indian direct-to-video films
Indian romantic comedy films